Sándor Popovics (22 June 1939 – 1 July 2019) was a Hungarian-Dutch association football manager and a professional footballer in the position of forward.

Playing  career

Club
As a footballer he played for Újpest Dózsa (1958–1960). When in 1960 he played a game in Austria, he defected from Soviet Union-oppressed Hungary. He continued his football career in Germany at SpVgg Fürth (1960–1963) and later moved to Holland to play for Sparta (1963–64), and FC Zaanstreek (1964–1966).

Managerial career
After retiring form playing, Popovics coached Dutch amateur clubs Quick (1970–1971), MVV '27 (1971–1972), RFC Rotterdam (1972–1974), Overmaas (1974-1976), Unitas (1976–1977), Xerxes (1977–1978) and Barendrecht (1978–1980). The first professional team he managed was SVV Schiedam (1980–1981), then Belgian side KSV Waregem (1981–83). Back in the Netherlands he continued coaching professional teams De Graafschap (1983–1985), NEC Nijmegen (1985–1987), Cambuur (1988–1990), Excelsior Rotterdam (1990–1992), FC Eindhoven (1993–1994) and RBC Roosendaal (July 2010). At Roosendaal he left after six days as the club tried to have his unlicensed deputies do the main work.
He also managed Hungarian club MTK Budapest twice and Belgian side Verbroedering Geel, succeeding Dimitri Mbuyu.

Sándor Popovics held the position of general manager at ADO Den Haag and was named head scout at NAC in February 2002

Personal life
He became a naturalized Dutch citizen in 1970.
Popovics was married to Corrie, the ex-wife of Theo Laseroms, and was father-in-law of former NEC Nijmegen and Hungary goalkeeper Gábor Babos. He suffered from Alzheimer's disease and died on 1 July 2019.

References

1939 births
2019 deaths
Sportspeople from Keszthely
Dutch people of Hungarian descent
Hungarian emigrants to the Netherlands
Naturalised citizens of the Netherlands
Association football forwards
Hungarian footballers
Újpest FC players
SpVgg Greuther Fürth players
Sparta Rotterdam players
AZ Alkmaar players
Hungarian expatriate footballers
Expatriate footballers in West Germany
Expatriate footballers in the Netherlands
Hungarian football managers
BVV Barendrecht managers
SV SVV managers
K.S.V. Waregem managers
De Graafschap managers
NEC Nijmegen managers
SC Cambuur managers
Excelsior Rotterdam managers
FC Eindhoven managers
MTK Budapest FC managers
RBC Roosendaal managers
Hungarian expatriate football managers
Expatriate football managers in the Netherlands
Expatriate football managers in Belgium
Hungarian expatriate sportspeople in the Netherlands
Hungarian expatriate sportspeople in Belgium
Hungarian defectors
Nemzeti Bajnokság I managers
Deaths from Alzheimer's disease